Arie Machnes (1921-2008) was an Israeli footballer who played in Maccabi Herzliya and Maccabi Netanya.

Both of his sons, Oded and Gad played for Maccabi Netanya and of the Israel national football team.

Honours
Israel State Cup:
Runner-up (1): 1954

References

1921 births
2008 deaths
Israeli Jews
Israeli footballers
Maccabi Herzliya F.C. players
Maccabi Netanya F.C. players
Association football midfielders
Liga Leumit players